Lincoln Park Zoo is a small municipal zoo located in Manitowoc, Wisconsin. The zoo has just under 200 animals, including black bear, bald eagle, cougar, lynx and others. It is situated along the Little Manitowoc River and provides a deck for viewing ducks, geese, and many other birds that gather along the river.

Exhibits

Big Red Barn
The Lincoln Park Zoo's Big Red Barn was built in 2000 with the support of the Manitowoc County Farm Bureau and Manitowoc County Dairy Promotions. The barn is located on the north end of the zoo. The Big Red Barn is home to a variety of young farm animals, on loan from local farmers. Chickens, goats, cows, lop-eared rabbits, pigs and turkeys are housed at the barn.

Education Center
The Zoo's Education Center is located on the second floor of the Education and Animal Care Building and is home to Wisconsin native reptiles, insects, amphibians, fish and birds. The Education Center features animals such as the African spurred tortoise, Ball pythons, Box turtles, Chilean rose tarantula, honeybees, and Cedar waxwing.

Animals

Asiatic black bear
Bald eagle
Bison
Cougar
Dall sheep
Rouen, Muscovy, Pekin, and Cayuga ducks
Great horned owl
Embden and Toulouse geese
Grey wolf
Lynx
Pigeons
Prairie dogs
Red-tailed hawk
Tundra swan
Turkey vulture
White-tailed deer

Incidents
 In 1994 a timber wolf attacked a child and ripped off his right arm, prompting other Wisconsin zoos to review their own safety. 
 In 2007, two cougars were released from their cages at the zoo by unknown vandals.
 In 2010, a woman had two fingers bitten off after she ignored barriers to try to feed an Asiatic black bear.

References

External links
 Lincoln Park Zoo

Zoos in Wisconsin
Tourist attractions in Manitowoc County, Wisconsin
Buildings and structures in Manitowoc County, Wisconsin